Cheltenham Secondary College is a co-educational high school in Cheltenham, Victoria, Australia, catering for students in years 7 to 12. The school officially opened in 1959 as 'Cheltenham High School', and then later changed its name to Cheltenham Secondary College. The school is most famous for its Windsor-Cheltenham Exchange. The exchange in its 55th year is participated by Avenues College in Adelaide and Cheltenham where a range of sports and other activities are played out over a week to see who will win the Exchange Shield, Captains Plate and Exchange Cup.

Facilities 
Below is a list of some of the school's facilities. 

Sports Centre:
The sports centre was officially opened in July 2003 and comprises two full-sized indoor courts, electronic scoreboard, elevated spectator seating (burnt down in an arson attack in 2020), fully equipped changing rooms, as well as kitchen and storage facilities. Physical education classes, weekly sport rotations and whole-school assemblies are regularly held in the sports centre.

Performing Arts Centre:
The performing arts centre was officially opened in late 2003 and was developed from the previous school hall. The centre comprises a 200-seat theatre, two music classrooms, two spacious drama/theatre studies classrooms as well as several music tuition rooms. The annual school production is presented in the centre every year.

Downball Courts:
The down ball courts first painted in the mid-1980s and have been frequently repainted over the years. Downball is the most popular sport in the school and the school prides itself on its Downball prowess.

Uniform 
Students are strictly required to wear a school uniform on school grounds and at off-campus school events unless specifically announced otherwise. The standard uniform consists of a distinct boys' uniform, girls' uniform, summer uniform (worn during terms 1 and 4), winter uniform (worn during terms 2 and 3), as well as optional items and accessories. In addition, students are required to wear a sports uniform during physical education classes and weekly sport rotations.

Standard girls' uniform

Girls' summer uniform: 
navy blue v-neck woollen jumper with school logo (blood red jumper for VCE students), 
bottle green tartan dress, 
royal blue ankle socks OR navy blue knee-high socks, 
appropriate black school shoes.

Girls' winter uniform:
navy blue v-neck woollen jumper with school logo (blood red jumper for VCE students),
white-collared school shirt,
plain navy blue school tie,
bottle green tartan skirt,
navy blue knee-high socks OR opaque black school tights, and
appropriate black school shoes.

Standard boys' uniform

Boys' summer uniform:
Navy blue v-neck woollen jumper with school logo (blood red jumper for VCE students),
Short or long-sleeved, white collared school shirt,
Navy blue school tie with gold and red stripes,
Grey school shorts,
Light-grey speckled woollen walking socks, and
Appropriate black school shoes.

Boys' winter uniform:
Navy blue v-neck woollen jumper with school logo (blood red jumper for VCE students),
Short or long-sleeved, white collared school shirt,
Navy blue school tie with gold and red stripes,
Dark-grey school trousers,
Dark-grey woollen walking socks and
Appropriate black school shoes.

Enrolment and school structure

The school is functionally divided into two sub-schools; a Junior School, catering for students in years 7 to 9; and a Senior School, catering for students in year 10 and VCE. The school's total enrolment exceeds 1100 students every year, and excessive demand for enrolment into year 7 over the past decade have restricted the school's annual year 7 enrolment to a specific geographical zone surrounding the school. Applicants residing outside of the zone must submit a formal written application in order to be considered for enrolment.

Notable former students
Jake Bowey
Trevor Barker

References

Public high schools in Melbourne
Educational institutions established in 1959
1959 establishments in Australia
Cheltenham, Victoria
Buildings and structures in the City of Kingston (Victoria)